Ömürcan Artan (born 27 July 1999) is a Turkish football player who plays as a rightback for Gaziantep in the Süper Lig.

Professional career
Artan is a youth product of Mamak, Başkent Edaşspor, and Gençlerbirliği. He signed his first contract with Gençlerbirliği in 2019 before immediately joining Hacettepe in a year long loan. He returned to Gençlerbirliği  in 2020, and started playing with their senior squad in the Süper Lig. Artan made his professional debut with Gençlerbirliği in a 1-1 Süper Lig tie with MKE Ankaragücü on 20 December 2020. 

On 27 June 2022, Artan transferred to Gaziantep signing a 4-year contract.

References

External links
 
 

1999 births
Living people
People from Yenimahalle
Turkish footballers
Gençlerbirliği S.K. footballers
Hacettepe S.K. footballers
Gaziantep F.K. footballers
Süper Lig players
TFF Second League players
Association football fullbacks